Nicholas Kaufmann (born February 21, 1969) is an American author of horror fiction, urban fantasy, and adventure fiction. His work has been nominated for the Bram Stoker Award, The Shirley Jackson Award, the International Thriller Writers Award, and the Dragon Award.

Early and personal life
Kaufmann was born in New York City to parents Lois G. Kaufmann (née Gordon), a medical receptionist, and John M. P. Kaufmann, a wholesale leather supplier. He spent much of his youth in Westport, Connecticut, where he attended Coleytown Elementary School until the sixth grade. Moving back to New York City, he attended and graduated from Columbia Grammar and Preparatory School, and went on to receive a B.A. from Sarah Lawrence College. He lives in Brooklyn, NY with his wife Alexa Antopol..

Awards
 The Dragon Award nominee for 100 Fathoms Below
The Bram Stoker Award nominee for General Slocum’s Gold
 The International Thriller Writers Award nominee for Chasing the Dragon
 The Shirley Jackson Award nominee for Chasing the Dragon

Bibliography
 Novels
 Hunt at World’s End (2009).
 Dying Is My Business (2013)
 Die and Stay Dead (2014)
 In the Shadow of the Axe (2016)
 100 Fathoms Below co-written with Steven L. Kent (2018)
The Hungry Earth (2021)
The Stone Serpent (2022)
 Novellas
 Chasing The Dragon (2010)
 Collections
 Walk In Shadows: Collected Stories (2003)
 Still Life: Nine Stories (2012)
 Chapbooks
 General Slocum's Gold (2007)
 Anthologies
 Jack Haringa Must Die!: Twenty-Eight Original Tales of Madness, Terror, and Strictly Grammatical Murder (2008)

References

External links
 
 
 The Big Idea: Nicholas Kaufmann
 Ten Questions About Dying Is My Business
 Die and Stay Dead review at The Big Thrill

1969 births
Living people
21st-century American male writers
American horror writers
Sarah Lawrence College alumni
Writers from New York City
Columbia Grammar & Preparatory School alumni